Carmen Gast (born November 16, 1994) is a Hong Kong female acrobatic gymnast. With partners Ho Ching Lam and Lam Ho Ching, Carmen Gast competed in the 2014 Acrobatic Gymnastics World Championships.

References

1994 births
Living people
Hong Kong acrobatic gymnasts
Female acrobatic gymnasts